The Patriotic Action Groups (GAP), formed by the general command of the Garibaldi Brigades at the end of October 1943, were small groups of partisans that were born on the initiative of the Italian Communist Party to operate mainly in the city, based on the experience of the French Resistance. The militants of the GAP were called . By extension, the less numerous partisan socialist and shareholder city units were also called GAP.

One of the successful operations of the GAP was the Via Rasella attack in March 1944. Led by Bruno Fanciullacci, members of the GAP also assassinated Italian fascist philosopher Giovanni Gentile in April 1944.

Bibliography 
 Istituto Storico Modena. Archived June 9, 2008 in the Internet Archive.
 Pietro Secchia, Enzo Nizza, Encyclopedia of anti-fascism and resistance, vol. II, La Pietra, 1968, entry "GAP", p. 476.
 Paolo Spriano, History of the Italian Communist Party, vol. V, The Resistance. Togliatti and the new party, Turin, Einaudi, 1975, p. 184.
 Interview with Carla Capponi and Rosario Bentivegna by Cesare De Simone, Rome '44: the patriots and the people ( PDF ), in l'Unità , 24 March 1972. In the interview, the former gappists criticize the use of the initials GAP by the Partisan Action Groups of Giangiacomo Feltrinelli. Carla Capponi in fact continues: "I think this too can convey the idea of the provocation carried out today by those who hide behind the glorious GAP acronym, making it a secret and terrorist sect".
 Lieutenant Legislative Decree 21 August 1945, n. 518, Provisions concerning the recognition of partisans' qualifications and the examination of reward proposals, on gazzettaufficiale.it.
 Civil Court of Rome, judgment of 26 May-9 June 1950.
 Letter from Giorgio Amendola to Leone Cattani Archived June 3, 2009, at the Internet Archive.
 Interview with Rosario Bentivegna.
 Antonello Trombadori, The military and illegal network of the PCI, in: The PCI in Rome from its foundation to 1976.
 Antonello Trombadori, motivation for the honor of military valor
 Letter from "Vineis" (Pietro Secchia) to the centre of the PCI of Rome, Milan, November 20, 1943, in Longo 1973, pp. 136–7.

Communist organisations in Italy
1943 establishments in Italy
Italian resistance movement
1945 disestablishments in Italy